Eline Tolstoy (born 1965) is a Dutch astronomer.

Life and education
Tolstoy grew up in Scotland and gained a BSc (Hons) from the University of Edinburgh in 1988. She studied at Leiden University (doctoral, 1990) and then in 1995, she received her doctorate from the University of Groningen, under the supervision of A. Saha, Piet van der Kruit and Harvey Butcher. The title of her thesis was `Modeling the resolved stellar populations of nearby dwarf galaxies'.

Post-doctorate career
She worked as an ESA Postdoctoral Fellow, at ST-ECF Garching, Germany (1996–1998), followed by an ESO postdoctoral fellowship, Garching, Germany (1998–2000). She spent a year at Oxford University as Gemini Support Scientist.

She has been working at the University of Groningen since 2001. In 2007, she received a Vici grant from the Netherlands Organization for Scientific Research. She has been a full professor at the Kapteyn Institute of the University of Groningen since 2011.

Tolstoy is the Dutch project leader for the MICADO instrument that accompanies the European Extremely Large Telescope.

Research interests
Her research interests centre mainly on understanding the formation and evolution of small (dwarf) galaxies by studying their resolved stellar populations. She is interested to discover what these systems can tell us about larger galaxies and their internal processes and also the clues that they may provide to our cosmological understanding of galaxy formation and evolution; right from the earliest phases up to the present day. This is often called ‘Local Group Cosmology’, or ‘Stellar Archaeology. Tolstoy prefers the term ‘Galactic Palaeontology’

Awards 
She was the 2006 Lecturer of the Year of the Faculty of Mathematics and Natural Sciences in Groningen

She won the 2007 Pastoor Schmeitsprijs, simultaneously with Simon Portegies Zwart.

She gave the 2013 Royal Astronomical Society George Darwin Lecture with the title 'Galactic Archaeology.’

References

1965 births
Living people
20th-century Dutch astronomers
21st-century Dutch astronomers
Alumni of the University of Edinburgh
Leiden University alumni
University of Groningen alumni
Academic staff of the University of Groningen
Women astronomers